NEDD4-like E3 ubiquitin-protein ligase WWP2 also known as atrophin-1-interacting protein 2 (AIP2) or WW domain-containing protein 2 (WWP2) is an enzyme that in humans is encoded by the WWP2 gene.

Function 

This gene encodes a member of the NEDD4-like protein family. The family of proteins is known to possess ubiquitin-protein ligase activity. The encoded protein contains 4 tandem WW domains. The WW domain is a protein motif consisting of 35 to 40 amino acids and is characterized by 4 conserved aromatic residues. The WW domain may mediate specific protein–protein interactions. Three alternatively spliced transcript variants encoding distinct isoforms have been found for this gene. In neurons, murine ortholog Wwp2 and its homolog Wwp1 control polarity acquisition, formation, and branching of axons, as well as migration of newly born nerve cells into the cortical plate.

Interactions 

WWP2 has been shown to interact with SCNN1B and ATN1.

Clinical significance 

Full-length WWP2 (WWP2-FL), together with N-terminal, (WWP2-N); C-terminal (WWP2-C) isoforms bind to SMAD proteins.  WWP2-FL interacts with SMAD2, SMAD3 and SMAD7 in the TGF-β pathway. The WWP2-N isoform interacts with SMAD2 and SMAD3, whereas WWP2-C interacts only with SMAD7. Disruption of interactions between WWP2 and SMAD7 can stabilize SMAD7 protein levels and prevent TGF-β induced Epithelial-mesenchymal transition. Hence inhibiting WWP2 may in turn lead to the disabling of an inhibitor that normally controls cell growth and tumorogenesis. In tissue cultures lacking the inhibitor SMAD7, cancer cells spread rapidly, so that silencing WWP2 prevented the spread.

References

Further reading 

 
 
 
 
 
 
 
 
 
 
 

EC 6.3.2